Bond Sound is a sound located on the northeast side of Tribune Channel in the Central Coast region of British Columbia. Bond Sound, with the head of Kingcome Inlet to its north, frames the Wishart Peninsula.

Ahta Indian Reserve No. 3 is located at the sound's northeast corner, at the mouth of the Ahta River.

To the west of Bond Sound, on the same side of Tribune Channel, is Kwatsi Bay.

References

Sounds of British Columbia
Central Coast of British Columbia